Asia Pacific Leaders Malaria Alliance (APLMA) is an affiliation of Asian and Pacific heads of government formed to accelerate progress against malaria and to eliminate the disease in the region by 2030. The mission of the secretariat is to translate strong political commitment into action, and realize an Asia Pacific Region free of malaria and with reduced risk from other communicable diseases.

The need to engage and support leaders and finance ministers led to the creation of APLMA, using the East Asia Summit process to galvanize heads of government. APLMA also presents an important platform from which to use malaria as an entry point for broader strategic dialogue on health systems and security.

History
APLMA and its secretariat were created at the 2013 Brunei East Asia Summit (EAS) in response to leaders' growing concerns about the risk of a malaria resurgence, following a Declaration on Regional Responses to Malaria Control and Addressing Resistance to Antimalarial Medication meeting of the EAS in 2012. The APLMA Secretariat formally commenced operations in January 2014 and is currently based in Singapore.

The APLMA Mission is to support and facilitate elimination of malaria across Asia Pacific by 2030: Driving implementation of the APLMA Leaders Malaria Elimination Roadmap by benchmarking progress against priorities, coordinating regional action and brokering policy, technical and financing solutions to regional and national challenges and bolstering effective country leadership to expedite elimination of malaria at country level by 2030.

References

External links 
 Office website
 Malaria can be eliminated in India by 2030, according to the Asia Pacific Leaders Malaria Alliance, Times of India, 26 April 2017

Public health organizations
Malaria